The Tolyatti City Duma is the city duma of Tolyatti, Russia. A total of 35 deputies are elected for five-year terms.

Elections

2018

References

Tolyatti